General Woodruff may refer to:

Carle Augustus Woodruff (1841–1913), U.S. Army brigadier general
Charles Woodruff (general) (1845–1920), U.S. Army brigadier general
Roscoe B. Woodruff (1891–1975), U.S. Army major general

See also
Attorney General Woodruff (disambiguation)